Delos White Beadle (October 17, 1823 – August 30, 1905) was a horticulturist, journalist and municipal politician from St. Catharines, Ontario. He edited the Canadian Horticulturist from 1878 to late 1886, and was the author of Canada's first gardening guide, Canadian fruit, flower, and kitchen gardener.

Biography

Beadle's father was a physician from New York State who established a successful practice and also became the owner of the St Catharines Nursery which quickly became an important cultivator of fruit trees.

Beadle served on St. Catharines City Council in 1886–87.

References

External links
 
 Biography at the Dictionary of Canadian Biography Online

1823 births
1905 deaths
Canadian horticulturists
Canadian magazine editors
St. Catharines city councillors